Cresco  may refer to:

Places 

Cresco, Indiana, USA
Cresco, Iowa, USA
Cresco, Pennsylvania, USA

Other 

Cresco (company), a credit card company
Cresco Labs, a cannabis and medical marijuana company
PAC Cresco, an aircraft

See also
Crisco, a shortening brand
Crisco (surname), a surname
Ceresco (disambiguation)